The men's 100 metres was a sprinting event on the athletics programme at the 1900 Summer Olympics in Paris. It was held on July 14, 1900. 20 athletes from nine nations competed. The event was won by Frank Jarvis of the United States, the second of three straight gold medals by different Americans in the event. Australia medaled in the event for the first time, a bronze by Stan Rowley.

Background

This was the second time the event was held. None of the 1896 runners competed in 1900. American Arthur Duffey had recently won the AAA Championships (at 100 yards) and was heavily favored. Unofficial world record holder (in a many-way tie) Isaac Westergren of Sweden also entered the competition. 

No athletes from France, the host nation, competed. Australia, Bohemia, India, and Italy were represented for the first time.

The 1900 competition was one of only two Olympic Games (along with 1904) where the men's 100 metres was not the shortest sprint, with the 60 metres being held in those two years.

Records
These were the standing world and Olympic records (in seconds) prior to the 1900 Summer Olympics.

Arthur Duffey in the first heat of the first round and Walter Tewksbury in the second heat of the first round set new Olympic records with 11.4 seconds. In the third heat of the first round Frank Jarvis equalled the unofficial world record with 10.8 seconds. In the second semifinal Tewksbury also equalled the world record with 10.8 seconds.

Competition format

The competition consisted of four rounds: heats, semifinals, a repechage, and a final. The top two runners in each of the six heats advanced to the semifinals. Those 12 men were divided into 3 semifinals of 4 runners each. The 1st-place runner in each semifinal advanced directly to the final, the 2nd and 3rd place runners went to the repechage, and the 4th place finisher was eliminated. In the 6-man repechage, only the winner advanced to the final and everyone else was eliminated.

Schedule

Results

First round

In the first round, there were six heats. The top two runners in each advanced to the semifinals.

Heat 1

Duffey was a metre ahead of Moloney at the finish.

Heat 2

Tewksbury won this heat by six inches.

Heat 3

The fastest of the preliminary heats featured two of the eventual medallists; Jarvis won by a metre and equalled the world record.

Heat 4

Leiblee won this heat by half a yard.

Heat 5

The fifth heat was the only one that was not won by an American runner; Pritchard beat Minahan by half a yard.

Heat 6

In an all-American heat, Burroughs defeated Boardman by about a metre, with Slack in third to become the only American runner to be eliminated in the first round.

Semifinals

There were three semifinals, each with four runners. The top runner in each of the semifinals advanced to the final, while the second and third place runners competed in the repechage. The winner of the six-runner repechage advanced to the final as well.

Semifinal 1

Duffey dropped almost half a second from his preliminary heat time to beat Rowley by five feet. Burroughs again defeated Boardman, eliminating Boardman from competition while remaining in contention in the repechage.

Semifinal 2

Tewksbury equalled the world record, the second runner to accomplish that at the Paris Games, with Leiblee six inches behind him. There is some question as to whether Dörry started the race, but he did not finish it.

Semifinal 3

Jarvis won by a yard, McClain and Pritchard were relegated to the repechage, and Minahan was eliminated.

Repechage

The repechage was a very close race, with Rowley defeating Pritchard by two inches.  Rowley advanced to the final while Pritchard and the four Americans were eliminated.

Final

Duffey got away to an early lead, but pulled a tendon at the 50 meter mark. Jarvis beat Tewksbury by two feet, with Rowley half a yard behind.

Sources

 International Olympic Committee.
 De Wael, Herman. Herman's Full Olympians: "Athletics 1900". Accessed 18 March 2006.
 

Men's 0100 metres
100 metres at the Olympics